Badeaux is a surname. Notable people with the surname include:

 Jean-Baptiste Badeaux (1741––1796), Canadian state notary
 Joseph Badeaux (1777––1835), his son, Canadian notary, militia captain and politician
 Roberto Palazuelos (Roberto Palazuelos Badeaux, born 1967), Mexican actor

See also 
 Badea (disambiguation)
 Badeau

French-language surnames